Gan-Yavne is a town in central Israel, located adjacent to the city of Ashdod. Gan Yavne was founded in 1931 and achieved local council status in 1950. It  lies east of the Tel Aviv–Ashkelon highway, and is bordered to the west by Ashdod, to the north by Gederot Regional Council, and to the east and south by Be'er Tuvia Regional Council. The population in Gan-Yavne is nearly entirely Jewish.

The houses in Gan Yavne are either villas or cottages, and it has a modern village-esque ambience.

History
Gan Yavne was established in 1931 by the "Achuza Aleph" Company founded by several Jewish families from Russia and Poland, who had immigrated to the United States. The inspiration for its name "Gan Yavne", comes from its proximity to the historical city of Yavne. In 1930 land was purchased and plans were drawn up to plant 400 dunams of orange groves. After negotiations with the Mandatory government between 1936 and 1938, a road was paved to Gan Yavne. The village was designed as a garden city.

As of 2017, the town has over 23,000 residents, who are almost exclusively Jewish.

Urban development

In the 1990s and 2000s Gan Yavne more than doubled its population, becoming a commuter town. The development of Highway 4, which is a freeway between Tel Aviv and Gan Yavne junction, and also the introduction of frequent rail service to the nearby Ashdod railway station, allows commuters to travel to Tel Aviv in 30–45 minutes.

Education and culture
Gan Yavne has 38 kindergartens, 5 state elementary schools (Ben-Gurion, Maccabim, Ilan Ramon, Ehud Manor, and Nofey Moledet), a state religious elementary school (Sinai), and 2 junior highs/high schools (Ort Itzhak Rabin and Ort Naomi Shemer). Beit Apple youth village is also located in Gan Yavne.

The town has a community center and library, a community center for the elderly, gyms and sports fields, and a country club.

It also has had a number of youth movements (Hebrew Scouts, HaNoar HaOved VeHaLomed, Bnei Akiva, Rotary Interact, HaNoar HaLeumi, and several others).

Twin towns – sister cities

Gan Yavne is twinned with:
  Puteaux, France (since 1973)
  Winnipeg, Manitoba, Canada (since 1984)

Notable residents
 Itay Levi (born 1988) - Israeli singer and reality judge at Rising Star (Israel) (formerly Rising Star (Israel) to the Eurovision).
 Itay Turgeman (born 1983) - Israeli actor and television host and an Ophir Award winner in 2002
 Iman Al-Abud - Israeli-Bedouin reality contestant girl at Project Y second season in 2004
 Matan Ohayon (born 1986) - former Israeli Premier League footballer
 Inna Bakelman (born 1989) - Israeli actress, model and reality contestant girl at Survivor Israel third season in 2009 
 Lior Ohayon - Israeli chef, fashion designer and reality contestant girl at MasterChef Israel eighth season in 2019 as well as at The Next Restaurant of Israel first season in 2022
 Dana Zalah - Israeli singer and reality final stages girl at The Voice Israel second season in 2012
 Matan Jaboc (born 1989) - Israel's Channel 12 News (formerly known as Channel 2 News) weather presenter
 Shoval Elgrabli (born 1993) - Israeli model and a Miss Israel 2012 beauty pageant contestant
 Sahar Calizo (born 1993) - Israeli YouTuber starring in HOT's docu-reality Project Calizo in 2018
 Bar Cohen - Israeli singer and reality winner girl at Eyal Golan Kore Lach fourth season in 2016
 Roni Brachel (born 2000) - Israeli model, singer and reality contestant girl at Rising Star (Israel) to the Eurovision fifth season; a Miss Israel 2020 beauty pageant contestant

See also
 Ort Itzhak Rabin

References

Local councils in Central District (Israel)
Populated places established in 1931
1931 establishments in Mandatory Palestine